Gazor Sang, also known as Qāder Sang and Qādirsang, is a village in Ahmadabad Rural District, in the Central District of Nazarabad County, Alborz Province, Iran. At the 2006 census, its population was 512, in 136 families.

References 

Populated places in Nazarabad County